John Henry Leech (5 December 1862 – 29 December 1900) was an English entomologist who specialised in Lepidoptera and Coleoptera.

His collections from  China, Japan, and Kashmir are in the Natural History Museum, London. These also contain insects from Morocco, the Canary Islands, and  Madeira.
  
He wrote British Pyralides (1886) and Butterflies from China, Japan and Corea, three volumes (1892–1894).

He was a fellow of the Linnean Society and of the Entomological Society of London, a member of the Société entomologique de France, and of the Entomological Society of Berlin (Entomologischen Verein zu Berlin).

He died at his home, Hurdcott House, near Salisbury, in 1900.

Legacy
John Henry Leech is commemorated in the scientific name of a species of lizard, Enyalius leechii.

References

Sources
Anonymous (1901). "Leech, J. H." Entomologist's Monthly Magazine. (2) 12 (37)(2): 49-50.
Anonymous (1901). "Leech, J. H."  Entomologist. 34: 33-38.
Gilbert, P. (2000). Butterfly Collectors and Painters. Four Centuries of Colour Plates from the Library Collections of the Natural History Museum, London. Singapore: Beaumont Publishing Pte Ltd.
Inoue, H. (2005). "John Henry Leech (1862–1900)".  The Pioneers of Moth-Fauna of Japan. 1 Yugato.
Verrall, G. H. (1900). Proceedings of the Entomological Society of London.

External links
NHM Manuscript Collection.
Internet Archive Catalogue of the Collection of Palaearctic Butterflies Formed by the Late John Henry Leech, and Presented to the Trustees of the British Museum by His Mother, Mrs. Eliza Leech (1902) British Museum (Natural History.
Internet Archive Leech, John Henry On Lepidoptera Heterocera from China, Japan, and Corea (1897?) and BDH  Volumes 1 and 2

English lepidopterists
1862 births
1900 deaths
Fellows of the Royal Entomological Society